Aurhø Peak is a peak with a gravel moraine on the northwest side, situated  east of Slettfjell in the Ahlmann Ridge of Queen Maud Land. It was mapped by Norwegian cartographers from surveys and from air photos by the Norwegian-British-Swedish Antarctic Expedition (1949–1952), led by John Schjelderup Giæver, and named "Aurhø" (gravel height).

References
 

Mountains of Queen Maud Land
Princess Martha Coast